Multi-amp guitar rigs use two or more amplifiers to create a unique tone that could not be achieved with the use of only one amplifier.  Guitar players such as James Valentine (Maroon 5) and Joh la’Mayær use multiple amplifiers simultaneously to achieve their tones.  Session guitar players such as Brent Mason often bring four or more amplifiers to recording sessions.  There are many different types of guitar amplifiers that have drastically different sounds.  There are three classic guitar amplifier circuits that most amplifiers are based on that all use different power amplifier tubes:  The EL84 powered class A circuits which comes from the Vox AC30 and AC15 amplifiers,  The 6L6 and 6V6 powered class AB circuits which come from Fender amplifiers, and the EL34 powered class AB circuits which come from Marshall amplifiers.  The sonic characteristics of these different amplifier configurations are extremely different and for a lot of guitar players it is important to have the tonal palette of all three.  This is especially true for studio guitarists and is why a lot of high-end recording studios have multiple different types of guitar amplifiers in house.  It is a common practice to use a 6L6 or 6V6 powered amplifier for a clear, clean tone in conjunction with an EL34 or EL84 powered amplifier for a more distorted tone.  It is then a matter of blending the two amps' signals in order to achieve the desired amount of distortion.

Use of Effects with Multiple Amplifiers 

The use of effects with multiple guitar amps is a common way to achieve a "bigger-sounding" tone.  One of the most common and easiest ways to achieve this is through the use of a stereo delay unit. The guitar's signal enters the delay unit and gets split into two signals.  One signal will usually be kept dry and go to one amplifier while the other signal will be delayed be a specific amount of time depending on the tempo of the song and go to the other amplifier.  This creates a much bigger sounding guitar tone than just one mono delay feeding one amplifier.  Oftentimes in the studio, dry and wet signals will be panned left and right in the mix to create a better stereo image.  This can be heard on a lot of Coldplay recordings.  Other common effects that are used with multi-amp rigs are stereo reverbs.  Stereo reverbs are often used with two of the same amp.  The advantage of using effects with multiple guitar amplifiers is that one can amplify a dry signal while another amplifies a wet signal with effects and the two signals can be blended in parallel.  A lot of guitar effects don't feature any kind of mix function so using two amplifiers allows the user to dial in the amount of effects being heard.

Common Problems using Multiple Guitar Amplifiers 

The most common problem with using multiple guitar amplifiers is that the phase of the amplifiers does not always line up.  If the two amplifiers are 180° out of phase, then the sound will be very thin sounding.  Most of the time, this can be fixed by reversing the polarity on the connection between one of the amplifiers and that amplifiers speaker.  However, there are units such as the radial phazer that can provide a more exact alignment of phase.  Another common problem with using multiple guitar amplifiers is that it can cause ground loops.  Ground loops happen when multiple amplifiers are running off of the same AC power source.  Signal gets from one amplifier to the other through the ground connection and causes a loud hum.  The most simple way around this is to simply use a three-prong to two-prong adapter on one of the amplifiers.  This lifts the ground connection and breaks the loop.  To avoid the safety hazard of lifting the ground on a high-powered amplifier, a lot of people use transformers to isolate the signals going to the amplifiers to solve the ground loop problem.  This is much more expensive but safer.

Instrument amplifiers